Karen Joy Greenberg is an American historian, professor, and author. She is Director of the Center on National Security at Fordham University School of Law.

Life and career
Greenberg earned a B.A. in history from Cornell University and a Ph.D. in history from Yale University. 

Greenberg founded the Center on National Security at Fordham University School of Law in September 2011, and currently serves as its director as of 2020. The Center conducts research and policy work on issues ranging from terrorism to cutting-edge issues of national and global security, including cybersecurity. Under Greenberg's direction, the Center has also begun to release their own publications. In June 2015, the Center released, By the Numbers: ISIS Cases in the United States, a report that analyzed the 59 U.S. ISIS-related cases at the time. In the following year, July 2016, an updated report, Case by Case: ISIS Prosecutions in the United States, was released, showcasing over 100 cases and giving more in-depth analysis.

Additionally, Greenberg oversees both The Soufan Group Morning Brief and The Cyber Brief, which are email newsletters distributed to the Center's subscribers daily and weekly respectively. The Morning Brief offers a daily roundup of important stories about national security, while the Cyber Brief offers a weekly recap of cyber news, highlights, and developments in cybersecurity law and policy.

From 2003 to 2011, Greenberg served as the founding Executive Director of the Center on Law and Security at New York University School of Law. She also served as a visiting or adjunct faculty member at New York University from 1994 to 2009. She previously taught at Bard College and served as Vice President for Programs at the Soros Foundation.

Greenberg has written extensively on the Guantanamo Bay detention camp, terrorism, civil liberties, and U.S. national security.  She is widely cited as a leading expert on national security and terrorism in The New York Times, The Washington Post, the Los Angeles Times, The Guardian, Mother Jones, The Daily Show, and many other media outlets. In addition, Greenberg has observed numerous terrorism trials and hearings, including the Sulaiman Abu Ghaith trial in 2014.

She is a permanent member of the Council on Foreign Relations.

Works 
Greenberg is the author or editor of six books. Her book, Rogue Justice: The Making of the Security State (Crown, 2016), explores the War on Terror's impact on justice and law in America, was published in May 2016. She appeared on C-SPAN as part of her book tour to discuss her most recent work. Greenberg's previous book, The Least Worst Place: Guantanamo's First 100 Days (Oxford University Press, 2009), was selected as one of the best books of 2009 by The Washington Post and Slate.com. She is co-editor with Joshua L. Dratel of The Enemy Combatant Papers: American Justice, the Courts and the War on Terror (Cambridge University Press, 2008) and The Torture Papers: The Road to Abu Ghraib (Cambridge University Press, 2005).  She is also editor of the books The Torture Debate in America (Cambridge University Press, 2006) and Al Qaeda Now (Cambridge University Press, 2005). Greenberg served as executive editor for The Terrorist Trial Report Card 2001-2011, an exhaustive study of the U.S. government's record of terrorism prosecutions since September 11, 2001.

References

External links 
 Karen J. Greenberg at Fordham University
 

Living people
Cornell University alumni
Yale University alumni
Fordham University faculty
New York University faculty
Bard College faculty
American women historians
21st-century American historians
21st-century American women writers
Year of birth missing (living people)